Guillermo Avila Paz (born 28 December 1960) is a Bolivian alpine skier. He competed at the 1988 Winter Olympics and the 1992 Winter Olympics.

References

External links
 

1960 births
Living people
Bolivian male alpine skiers
Olympic alpine skiers of Bolivia
Alpine skiers at the 1988 Winter Olympics
Alpine skiers at the 1992 Winter Olympics
Place of birth missing (living people)